Tambuti Airfield  is an airstrip serving the sugar plantation region around Big Bend, a town in the Lubombo Region of Eswatini.

See also

Transport in Eswatini
List of airports in Eswatini

References

External links
 OpenStreetMap - Tambuti Airport
 OurAirports - Tambuti
 FallingRain - Tambuti

 Google Earth

Airports in Eswatini